Rocky Gully is a small town in the Great Southern region of Western Australia.

A site was selected for a town when land in the area was sub-divided in the 1930s. By 1951 a small community was established as part of the War Service land settlement scheme and the townsite was gazetted.

References 

Great Southern (Western Australia)